Hoseynabad (also Romanized as Ḩoseynābād; also known as Ḩoseinābād-e Manūjān and Hosein Abad Manoojan) is a village in Qaleh Rural District, in the Central District of Manujan County, Kerman Province, Iran. At the 2006 census, its population was 1,728, in 355 families.

References 

Populated places in Manujan County